Nikita Tochitsky (born August 17, 1991) is a Russian professional ice hockey player. He is currently playing with HC Sochi of the Kontinental Hockey League (KHL).

Tochitsky made his Kontinental Hockey League debut playing with  HC Vityaz during the 2011–12 season. In the 2016–17 season, he was traded from SKA Saint Petersburg to HC Sochi on October 5, 2016.

References

External links

1991 births
Living people
Atlant Moscow Oblast players
Avtomobilist Yekaterinburg players
Sportspeople from Khabarovsk
Russian ice hockey forwards
SKA Saint Petersburg players
HC Sibir Novosibirsk players
HC Sochi players
Torpedo Nizhny Novgorod players
HC Yugra players
HC Vityaz players